Jonas Vervaeke (born 10 January 1992) is a Belgian footballer who plays for KSCT Menen.

External links
Player Profile at Voetbal International

1992 births
Living people
Belgian footballers
Belgium youth international footballers
K.V. Kortrijk players
K.M.S.K. Deinze players
Belgian Pro League players
Association football midfielders
Royal FC Mandel United players
Sint-Eloois-Winkel Sport players
People from Menen
Footballers from West Flanders